Hugh VIII the Old of Lusignan or (French: Hugues le Vieux) was the  Seigneur de Lusignan, Couhé, and Château-Larcher on his father's death in 1151. He went on crusade, was captured at battle of Harim, and died in captivity.

Biography
Born in Poitou, Hugh was the eldest son of Hugh VII and of Sarracena de Lezay. He married Burgondie de Rancon, Dame de Fontenay, daughter of Geoffroy de Rancon, Seigneur de Taillebourg and wife Fossefie (Falsifie), Dame de Moncontour, by whom Hugh also became Seigneur de Fontenay: she died on April 11, 1169. He renounced the land of Jouarenne, stating by charter that it was the property of the abbey of Nouaille.

In 1163, Hugh went on crusade to the Holy Land and participated in the Battle of Harim, where he was taken prisoner. He died in captivity.

Children
Hugh and Burgondie had:
 Hugh de Lusignan, Co-Seigneur de Lusignan in 1164 (c. 1141–1169), married before 1162 Orengarde N, who died in 1169, leaving two sons who were infants at the time of his death 
 Hugh IX of Lusignan
 Raoul I de Lusignan, Count of Eu
 Robert de Lusignan, died young c. 1150
 Geoffrey of Lusignan (bef. 1150 – May, 1216), Seigneur of Moncontour and Seigneur de Soubise, Seigneur de Vouvent, de Mervent by first marriage, Count of Jaffa and Ascalon on July 28, 1191 (he relinquished these titles upon his return from the Holy Land in 1193), who fought in the Siege of Acre. Married firstly Humberge de Limoges, daughter of Aimar V of Limoges and wife Sarra de Cornouailles, with whom he had a son named Hugo, and who probably died young. He married Eustache de Chabot, Dame de Vouvent et Dame de Mervent (d. after 1200).
 Peter de Lusignan (bef. 1155 – aft. December, 1174), witnessed a charter in Antioch in 1174, but is otherwise not documented. He died probably as a Priest.
 Amalric de Lusignan, born about 1145, died 1205. He succeeded his younger brother Guy as ruler of Cyprus; later he was crowned King of Cyprus, the first of the Lusignan dynasty, and eventually also became King of Jerusalem.
 Guy of Lusignan, died 1194. He was regent and afterwards King of Jerusalem. After the loss of Jerusalem he became Lord of Cyprus.
 William de Lusignan or de Valence, born after 1163, betrothed to Beatrix de Courtenay, daughter of Joscelin III of Edessa, in 1186. The marriage does not seem to have taken place. He died before 1208.

References

Sources

12th-century births
12th-century deaths
Year of birth uncertain
Year of death uncertain
Counts of La Marche
Christians of the Crusades
House of Lusignan
12th-century French people